Rasmus Daugaard (born September 15, 1976) is a retired Danish professional footballer. He played 210 games in the Danish Superliga with Akademisk Boldklub, FC Midtjylland, and Lyngby BK, and has also played for Lyn Oslo in Norway. He ended his career in August 2008.

References

External links
Danish national team profile
Danish Superliga statistics
Profile at lynfotball.net

1976 births
Living people
Danish men's footballers
Akademisk Boldklub players
FC Midtjylland players
Lyn Fotball players
Lyngby Boldklub players
Expatriate footballers in Norway
Danish expatriate sportspeople in Norway
Danish expatriate men's footballers
Danish Superliga players
Eliteserien players
Association football defenders
Footballers from Copenhagen